De Man is a Dutch surname, meaning "the man". The agglutinated form "Deman" is most common in West Flanders. People with this surname include:

De Man
Cornelis de Man (1621–1706), Dutch Golden Age painter
Dick de Man (1909–1996), Dutch swimmer
Filip De Man (born 1955), Belgian politician and journalist
 (born 1973), Dutch skier
Hendrik de Man, also known as Henri de Man (1885–1953), Belgian politician
Herman de Man (1898–1946), Dutch novelist, pseudonym of Salomon Herman Hamburger 
Johannes Govertus de Man (1850–1930), Dutch biologist
Joris de Man (born 1972), Dutch video game composer and sound designer
Mark De Man (born 1983), Belgian footballer
Paul de Man (1919–1983), Belgian literary critic
Preben De Man (born 1996), Belgian footballer
 (1900–1978), Belgian politician and Government Minister
 (born 1941), Dutch composer
Roelof de Man (1634–1663), Dutch administrator of the Cape Colony
Deman
Jo Deman (born 1983), Belgian scout leader
Paul Deman (1889–1961), Belgian cyclist
Robert Deman, American actor active in the 1970s

References

Dutch-language surnames

de:De Man